Aksoran is a mountain in Aktogay District, Karaganda Region, Kazakhstan.

Geologically the peak is made up of Permian granite.

Geography 
Aksoran rises in the Kyzylarai, a massif of the Kazakh Uplands (Saryarka). The mountain has a barren look and its slopes are steep, rocky and strongly dissected.
With an elevation , it is the highest mountain in the Kazakh Uplands, as well as the highest point of Central Kazakhstan.

See also
Geography of Kazakhstan

References

External links
 Aksoran peak

Kazakh Uplands
Mountains of Kazakhstan

ceb:Aqsorang Bīigi
kk:Ақсораң (Сарыарқа)
ru:Аксоран